Cigaritis is a genus of butterflies in the family Lycaenidae. Its species are found in the Afrotropical realm, the Indomalayan realm and adjacent regions of Asia.

Cigaritis includes species that used to be placed in two other genera: Apharitis Riley, 1925 and Spindasis Wallengren, 1857. The latter were synonymised with Cigaritis by Heath et al., 2002, and this synonymy is followed in recent works.

Species
Listed alphabetically:
Cigaritis abnormis (Moore, [1884])
Cigaritis acamas (Klug, 1834)
Cigaritis allardi Oberthür, 1909
Cigaritis apelles (Oberthür, 1878)
Cigaritis apuleia (Hulstaert, 1924)
Cigaritis arooni (Murayama & Kimura, 1990) northern Thailand
Cigaritis avriko (Karsch, 1893)
Cigaritis baghirmii (Stempffer, 1946)
Cigaritis bergeri (Bouyer, 2003) DRC, Katanga, Sandoa
Cigaritis brunnea (Jackson, 1966)
Cigaritis buchanani (Rothschild, 1921)
Cigaritis cilissa Lederer, 1861
Cigaritis collinsi (Kielland, 1980)
Cigaritis crustaria (Holland, 1890)
Cigaritis cynica (Riley, 1921)
Cigaritis dufranei (Bouyer, 1991)
Cigaritis elima (Moore, 1877) India and Ceylon
Cigaritis ella (Hewitson, 1865)
Cigaritis elwesi Evans, [1925] northwestern India
Cigaritis epargyros (Eversmann, 1854) Arabia, Afghanistan and northern China
Cigaritis evansii (Tytler, 1915) Assam
Cigaritis gilletti (Riley, 1925)
Cigaritis greeni (Heron, 1896) Ceylon
Cigaritis hassoni (Bouyer, 2003)
Cigaritis homeyeri (Dewitz, 1886)
Cigaritis ictis (Hewitson, 1865) Ceylon and India
Cigaritis iza (Hewitson, 1865)
Cigaritis junodi (D'Abrera, 1980) Transvaal
Cigaritis kutu (Corbet, 1940) Malaysia
Cigaritis learmondi (Tytler, 1940) Burma and Thailand
Cigaritis leechi (Swinhoe, 1912) western China
Cigaritis lilacinus (Moore, 1884) Burma
Cigaritis lohita (Horsfield, [1829])
Cigaritis lunulifera (Moore, 1879) India
Cigaritis lutosus (Plötz, 1880) Ashanti region, southeastern Ghana
Cigaritis maxima Staudinger, 1901
Cigaritis maximus (Elwes, [1893]) Burma, Thailand and Laos
Cigaritis menelas (Druce, 1907)
Cigaritis mishmisensis (South, 1913) Mishimi Hills (northeastern India) 
Cigaritis modestus (Trimen, 1891)
Cigaritis montana (Joicey & Talbot, 1924)
Cigaritis mozambica (Bertolini, 1850)
Cigaritis myrmecophila Dumont, 1922
Cigaritis nairobiensis (Sharpe, 1904)
Cigaritis namaquus (Trimen, 1874)
Cigaritis natalensis (Westwood, 1851)
Cigaritis nilus (Hewitson, 1865)
Cigaritis nipalicus (Moore, 1884) western India and Nepal
Cigaritis nubilus (Moore, [1887]) Ceylon
Cigaritis nyassae (Butler, 1884)
Cigaritis overlaeti (Bouyer, 1998)
Cigaritis phanes (Trimen, 1873)
Cigaritis pinheyi (Heath, 1983)
Cigaritis rukma (de Nicéville, [1889]) Sikkim and Bhutan
Cigaritis rukmini (de Nicéville, [1889]) Sikkim and Assam
Cigaritis schistacea (Moore, [1881]) India and Ceylon
Cigaritis scotti (Gabriel, 1954)
Cigaritis seliga (Fruhstorfer, 1912) Malaysia, southern Burma, Thailand and Borneo
Cigaritis shaba (Bouyer, 1991)
Cigaritis siphax (Lucas, 1849) Algeria and Tunisia
Cigaritis somalina (Butler, [1886])
Cigaritis syama (Horsfield, [1829]) central and western China, Taiwan, Malaysia, Indochina, Thailand, Sumatra, Singapore, Java, Borneo and Philippines
Cigaritis takanonis (Matsumura, 1906) Japan
Cigaritis tanganyikae (Kielland, 1990)
Cigaritis tavetensis (Lathy, 1906)
Cigaritis trifurcata (Moore, 1882) northwestern, central and eastern India
Cigaritis trimeni (Neave, 1910)
Cigaritis victoriae (Butler, 1884)
Cigaritis vixinga (Hewitson, 1875) Thailand, Borneo and Sumatra
Cigaritis vulcanus (Fabricius, 1775)
Cigaritis zhengweille (Huang, 1998) Yunnan (China)
Cigaritis zohra Donzel, 1847 Morocco and Algeria

Status unclear:
Cigaritis kuyaniana (Matsumura, 1919)

References

External links
"Cigaritis Donzel, 1847" at Markku Savela's Lepidoptera and Some Other Life Forms
Seitz, A. Die Gross-Schmetterlinge der Erde 13: Die Afrikanischen Tagfalter. Plate XIII 69

 
Lycaenidae genera
Taxa named by Hugo Fleury Donzel